Saša Novaković (born 27 May 1991) is a Croatian professional footballer who most recently played for Bosnian Premier League club Radnik Bijeljina.

References

External links

1991 births
Living people
Sportspeople from Osijek
Association football central defenders
Association football midfielders
Croatian footballers
NK Osijek players
HNK Vukovar '91 players
NK Crikvenica players
FC Brașov (1936) players
FC Voluntari players
FK Sarajevo players
R&F (Hong Kong) players
FK Radnik Bijeljina players
Croatian Football League players
Liga I players
Premier League of Bosnia and Herzegovina players
Hong Kong Premier League players
Croatian expatriate footballers
Expatriate footballers in Romania
Croatian expatriate sportspeople in Romania
Expatriate footballers in Bosnia and Herzegovina
Croatian expatriate sportspeople in Bosnia and Herzegovina
Expatriate footballers in Hong Kong
Croatian expatriate sportspeople in Hong Kong